Yortan is a belde (town) in Yenice district of Karabük Province, Turkey. The population of the town is 2167 as of 2017. There are several theories about the name of the town. It may refer to jars used as sepulcher in the ancient ages, sheep pens of Turkmens or feasts of Greeks of the medieval ages. The majority of Yortan people make their living as miners. According to mayor, Yortan has the highest percentage of mining-related accident or deaths for the total population in Turkey.

References

Populated places in Karabük Province
Towns in Turkey
Yenice District of Karabük